Gulaphaenops leptodiroides is a species of beetle in the family Carabidae, the only species in the genus Gulaphaenops.

References

Trechinae